Spurostigmatidae is a family of lice in the order Psocodea (formerly Psocoptera). There is at least one genus, Spurostigma, in Spurostigmatidae.

References

Further reading

 
 
 

Psocomorpha